The Canadian Forces' Unit Commendation is an award given to military units for "a deed or activity considered beyond the demand of normal duty".

Not only Canadian military units are eligible; Commonwealth and foreign units are also eligible if the deed occurred while serving alongside Canadian units.

This commendation is not given for acts in a combat operations zone, but the Commander-in-Chief Unit Commendation exists for such circumstances.

References

Military awards and decorations of Canada
Awards established in 1980